Higurashi may refer to:

Tanna japonensis, a type of cicada native to Japan
Shūichi Higurashi (1936–2012), a Japanese manga illustrator and magazine artist
Akane Higurashi, a fictional character from the anime and manga series My-HiME
the name of several fictional characters from the manga and anime series Inuyasha

See also

Higurashi: When They Cry, a Japanese dōjin sound novel, anime, and manga series 
Higurashi Daybreak, a computer game based on the visual novel
"Higurashi no Naku Koro ni (song)", the opening theme of the anime series